Patrick Petersen (born August 9, 1966) is an American actor best known for his role as Michael Fairgate in the television drama Knots Landing. He played the role from episode one on December 27, 1979, to May 16, 1991, reprising the part for Knots Landing: Back to the Cul-de-Sac in May 1997. He is the brother of former television actor Chris Petersen.

Petersen also was a regular cast member on the short-lived sitcom The Kallikaks (1977), and co-starred in the films Alligator (1980) and The Little Dragons (1980).

Since retiring from acting, Petersen owns a health-food business. He is married with two children.

Filmography

References

1966 births
American male television actors
American male child actors
Living people